In March 2013, FIFA published a list of 52 prospective referees, each paired, on the basis of nationality, with two assistant referees, from all six football confederations for the 2014 FIFA World Cup tournament. On 14 January 2014, the FIFA Referees Committee appointed 25 referee trios and eight support duos representing 43 different countries for the tournament.

1.Replaced assistant Referee Ravinesh Kumar, who missed the World Cup due to an injury.
2.Daniel Bennett missed the World Cup due to an injury.

Matches

References

officials